The North Shore consists of many affluent suburbs north of Chicago, Illinois, bordering the shore of Lake Michigan. These communities form part of Cook and Lake Counties. Exactly which communities comprise the "North Shore" is often a topic of debate, and some definitions include suburbs which do not border Lake Michigan. In general, Evanston, Wilmette,  Kenilworth, Winnetka, Glencoe, Highland Park, Northfield, Highwood, Lake Forest, Northbrook, Deerfield, Glenview, and Lake Bluff are recognized as part of the North Shore.

Communities and their years of settlement and incorporation 

Source:

History 
Europeans settled the area sparsely after an 1833 treaty with local Native Americans. The region began to be developed into towns following the opening of Northwestern University in Evanston in 1855 and the founding of Lake Forest College two years later, and the construction and launch of railroads serving the colleges and their towns.

Electric rail lines were also run from Chicago, parallel to steam commuter lines, and streetcars flourished throughout the suburbs from Evanston on north. The North Shore today is noteworthy for being one of the few remaining agglomerations of streetcar suburbs in the United States.

This area became popular with the affluent wanting to escape urban life, beginning after the Great Chicago Fire, and grew rapidly before and just after World War II with a growing Jewish population migrating out of various neighborhoods in Chicago. The major Jewish suburban communities include Evanston, Skokie, Glencoe, Northbrook, and Highland Park. Jews, however, were barred from living in Kenilworth and Lake Forest. The number of Jews in the north suburbs increased to 40% by the early 1960s.

In the 1960s, most of the northern suburbs were almost entirely white. One informal 1967 poll suggested that of 2,000 real estate listings, only 38 (around 2%) were open to African-Americans.

Origin and definition of term

The term North Shore began to come into use in the early 1880s, and by 1889, with the creation of the North Shore Improvement Association, the name was officially established.

In 1890, Joseph Sears used the term several times in a brochure that was written to promote the newly-forming community of Kenilworth. It is believed to have come into widespread use following the establishment in 1891 of the Waukegan & North Shore Rapid Transit Company, which in 1916 following reorganization was renamed the Chicago North Shore and Milwaukee Railroad ("CNS&M"), popularly known as the North Shore Line.  This railway ran along Lake Michigan's western shore between Chicago and Milwaukee. The Shore Line route of the CNS&M until 1955 served, from south to north, the Illinois communities of Chicago, Evanston, Wilmette, Kenilworth, Winnetka, Glencoe, Highland Park, Highwood, Fort Sheridan, Lake Forest, Lake Bluff, North Chicago, Waukegan,  Zion, and Winthrop Harbor as well as Kenosha, Racine, and Milwaukee (the "KRM") in Wisconsin. After 1924, the Skokie Valley line of the CNS&M opened land further west to the North Shore.

Meanwhile, in 1906, the Sanitary District of Chicago platted the "North Shore Channel" of the sanitary canal from the Chicago River, through Evanston and Wilmette to Lake Michigan.

While the CNS&M ran from Chicago all the way to Milwaukee, the term "North Shore" today typically refers only to the communities between Lake Bluff and Chicago. Michael Ebner's scholarly Creating Chicago's North Shore: A Suburban History, one of the most thorough studies of the area, covers eight suburbs along the lake:  Evanston, Wilmette, Kenilworth, Winnetka, Glencoe, Highland Park, Lake Forest, and Lake Bluff. In their North Shore Chicago: Houses of the Lakefront Suburbs, 1890-1940, Cohen and Benjamin include not only those eight suburbs but also "the tiny city of Highwood" which is slightly inland, just north of Highland Park.

Socioeconomics and culture

Today the North Shore remains one of the most affluent and highly educated areas in the United States. Seven of its communities are in the top quintile of U.S. household income, and five of those (Lake Forest, Glencoe, Kenilworth, Winnetka, Highland Park) are in the top 5 percent. The median household income is $127,000. 

The North Shore is also the home of the Ravinia Festival, a historic outdoor music theater in Highland Park, Illinois. The Ravinia Festival, originally conceived as a weekend destination on the CNS&M line, is now a popular destination on the Metra Union Pacific North Line commuter rail, the North Shore Line's former competitor. It hosts many concerts throughout the year that attract over 600,000 people. Highwood became home of the annual Pumpkin Festival which saw thousands of people every year flock to the small town for a week of music, food, community, and the lighting of 32,000 Jack o' Lanterns. The town used to hold the world record for most carved and lit Jack o' Lanterns but lost the title to Keene, New Hampshire. 

The abandoned right-of-way of the North Shore Line still serves Ravinia as the Green Bay Trail, a popular rails-to-trails bicycle path that begins in Wilmette and runs north all the way to the Illinois Beach State Park in Zion.

Despite being very nearly an enclave within Highland Park, Highwood has very different demographic characteristics than its neighbors. While its median income is close to the average for the state of Illinois, it has a much lower median income than neighboring municipalities. It is more densely populated, and is the only community on the North Shore where non-Hispanic whites do not constitute a majority of the population.

Expansion of the definition
It is becoming common for businesses in numerous nearby inland Chicago suburbs to name themselves as part of the "North Shore". Real estate and other marketers notably use the term for Maine, New Trier, Niles, Northfield, and Norwood Townships, as well as those of southern Lake County and other nearby communities. The former North Shore magazine had special advertising editions not only for Evanston, Winnetka, Lake Forest, and Lake Bluff, but also for Skokie, Glenview, Northbrook, Barrington, Bannockburn, and Riverwoods.

Chicago's North Shore Convention & Visitors Bureau's markets the City of Evanston and the Villages of Skokie, Glenview, Northbrook and Winnetka. More recently, a community newspaper known as "What's Happening" began mailing out its publication to what it characterizes as the "16 affluent North Shore suburbs": Bannockburn, Buffalo Grove, Deerfield, Fort Sheridan, Skokie, Glencoe, Glenview, Highland Park, Kenilworth, Libertyville, Lincolnshire, Northbrook, Northfield, Riverwoods, Vernon Hills, Wilmette, and Winnetka.

Overall, the general usage of the term "North Shore" may at times be applied to the following suburbs:Bannockburn; Buffalo Grove; Deerfield; Des Plaines; Evanston; Glencoe; Glenview; Golf; Green Oaks; Harwood Heights; Highland Park; Highwood; Kenilworth; Lake Bluff; Lake Forest; Libertyville; Lincolnshire; Lincolnwood; Mettawa; Morton Grove; Mundelein; Niles; Norridge; Northbrook; Northfield; Park Ridge; Riverwoods; Rosemont; Skokie; Vernon Hills; Wheeling; Wilmette; and Winnetka. This geographic area favored by marketeers extends from Chicago’s northern boundary into southern Lake County and from Lake Michigan to O’Hare Airport.

Education
Mostly the Central Suburban League public high schools serve the North Shore.  The Central Suburban League is an IHSA-recognized high school extracurricular conference comprising 12 public schools located in the northern suburbs of Chicago.  Comprising 12 relatively large high schools, it is among the larger high school conferences (by student population) in Illinois.  The Central Suburban League high schools include: Deerfield High School (Deerfield, IL), Evanston Township High School (Evanston, IL), Glenbrook North High School (Northbrook, IL), Glenbrook South High School (Glenview, IL), Highland Park High School (Highland Park, IL), Maine South High School (Park Ridge, IL), Maine East High School (Park Ridge, IL), Maine West High School (Des Plaines, IL), New Trier High School (Winnetka, IL), Niles West High School (Skokie, IL), Niles North High School (Skokie, IL), and Vernon Hills High School (Vernon Hills, IL).

Lake Forest High School, Libertyville High School, and Stevenson High School, are in the North Suburban Conference. The Lake Forest High School district serves Lake Forest and Lake Bluff, while the Stevenson High School district serves Lincolnshire and most of Buffalo Grove. Stevenson also takes in students from smaller parts of other North Shore suburbs such as Deerfield, Mettawa, Lake Forest, Riverwoods, Vernon Hills, as well as reaching into the far Northwest Suburbs such as Hawthorn Woods, Kildeer, Lake Zurich, Mundelein, and Long Grove.

Wheeling High School serves most of Wheeling, Illinois which is in the Mid-Suburban League.

A variety of private schools are found throughout the North Shore suburbs.

Higher education
Oakton Community College serves the same district as the Central Suburban League, with campuses in Des Plaines and Skokie. College of Lake County serves the Lake County suburbs of the North Shore, with its campus in Grayslake, Illinois. Harper College serves Wheeling with its campus in Palatine, Illinois.

Films and television set or filmed on the North Shore
This area received much exposure in the 1980s as the setting of many teen films, particularly those of writer/director John Hughes, who grew up in Northbrook and attended Glenbrook North High School. The most notable films through the years are:
 A Wedding (1978) was filmed at a house in Lake Forest.
 Ordinary People (1980) was filmed in Highwood, Highland Park, Lake Bluff, Lake Forest, Northbrook and Wilmette.
 Class (1983) was filmed at Lake Forest College in Lake Forest and other locations in Chicago.
 Risky Business (1983) was filmed in Deerfield, Highland Park, Skokie, Winnetka and Wilmette, in addition to Lake Shore Drive.
The Razor's Edge (1984) had portions of the film set in Lake Forest
 Sixteen Candles (1984) was filmed in Evanston, Glencoe, Highland Park, Skokie and Winnetka.
 The Breakfast Club (1985) was filmed mostly at Maine North High School in Des Plaines, with additional scenes filmed at Maine West High School in Des Plaines, Maine South High School in Park Ridge, and Glenbrook North High School in Northbrook. The iconic final scene of the film was filmed on Glenbrook North’s football field. 
 Weird Science (1985) was filmed in Highland Park, Skokie and Northbrook.
 Ferris Bueller's Day Off (1986) was filmed in Highland Park, Winnetka, Northbrook, Lake Forest, Des Plaines, and Glencoe, in addition to many locations in Chicago itself, with scenes filmed at Glenbrook North, New Trier High School and Maine North High School.
 Planes, Trains and Automobiles (1987) was filmed in Kenilworth.
 She's Having a Baby (1988) was filmed in Winnetka, Skokie, Glencoe and Northbrook in addition to many locations in Chicago itself.
 Uncle Buck (1989) was filmed in Evanston, Glencoe, Highland Park, Lake Forest, Northbrook, Northfield, Skokie, Wilmette and Winnetka, in addition to many locations in Chicago itself.
 Home Alone (1990) was filmed in Lake Forest, Winnetka, Wilmette, Highland Park and Evanston, and featured a Maine South High School letterman's jacket.
 Home Alone 2 (1992) 
 Chain Reaction (1996) has scenes at a famous Lake Bluff estate and was largely shot in downtown Chicago
 Home Alone 3 (1997) Filmed in Evanston.
 My Best Friend's Wedding (1997) has scenes at Cuneo Museum & Gardens and various Chicago locations
 Stolen Summer (2002) was set in the North Shore and filmed in Deerfield.
 Shattered Glass (2003)
 Cheaper by the Dozen (2003), as well as the beginning of  its 2005 sequel
 Ocean's 12 (2004) has filmed in the Chicago area and has a few North Shore filming locations: the home of Danny and Tess Ocean is in Winnetka, in the 600 block of Walden. Dimitrios Jewelers in Lake Forest is also in one of the scenes. One of the opening scenes in which Virgil Malloy is having his rehearsal dinner where Terry Benedict shows up was filmed in Lincolnwood, Illinois.
 Surviving Christmas (2004)
 The school in Mean Girls (2004) is called North Shore High School, and references several locations throughout the area such as Walker Brother’s Pancake House and Old Orchard Mall. Filming took place in Ontario.
 Derailed (2005)
 The Weather Man (2005) was filmed in Evanston and Skokie in addition to many locations in Chicago itself.
 The League (2009–2015) was set in Winnetka, with the main characters having attended the fictional North Winnetka High School.
 Source Code (2011)
 Contagion (2011) Matt Damon filmed scenes at a private home in the 500 block of Woodlawn Avenue in Glencoe.

Places of interest 

 Northwestern University, Evanston
 North Shore Center for the Performing Arts, Skokie
 Ravinia Festival, Highland Park, North America's oldest outdoor music festival.
 Chicago Botanic Garden, Glencoe
 Bahá'í Temple, Wilmette
 Illinois Holocaust Museum and Education Center, Skokie
 Kohl Children's Museum, Glenview
 Ward Willits House, Highland Park, designed by Frank Lloyd Wright in 1901
 North Point Marina, Winthrop Harbor
 Westfield Old Orchard Shopping Center, Skokie
 The Nature preserve Illinois Beach State Park, Zion
 Illinois Beach State Park
 Grosse Point Light, Evanston
 Zion Nuclear Power Station
 Fort Sheridan, Highwood
 Lake Forest College, Lake Forest

References

Bibliography 
 Berger, Philip. Highland Park: American Suburb at Its Best: An Architectural and Historical Survey. Chicago: Chicago Review Press, 1983
 Bushnell, George D. Wilmette: A history. Wilmette: The Village of Wilmette, 1984
 Cohen, Stuart Earl and Susan S. Benjamin. North Shore Chicago: Houses of the Lakefront Suburbs, 1890-1940. New York: Acanthus Press, 2004
 Dickinson, Lora Townsend. The Story of Winnetka. Winnetka: Winnetka Historical Society, 1956
 Ebner, Michael H. Creating Chicago’s North Shore. Chicago: The University of Chicago Press, 1988
 Foster, Clyde D. Evanston's Yesterdays: Stories of Early Evanston and Sketches of Some of Its Pioneers. Evanston: Privately printed, 1956
 
 
 Townsend, Frank with foreword by Patsy Ritter. Lake Bluff Illinois; a Pictorial History. Lake Bluff: Village of Lake Bluff Centennial Committee, 1995
 Waukegan Historical Society. Images of American - Waukegan, Illinois.Chicago: Arcadia Press, 2000

Chicago metropolitan area
Geography of Cook County, Illinois
Geography of Lake County, Illinois